Coray may refer to:

People
 Artúr Coray (1881–1909), Hungarian track and field athlete
 Coray Colina
 Ed Coray (1901–1993), American coach
 Hans Coray (1906–1991), Swiss artist
 Ira Coray Abbott, American soldier
 Martha Jane Knowlton Coray (1821–1881)

Places
 Coray, Finistère, France
 San Francisco de Coray, Honduras